2015 in television may refer to
 2015 in American television for television related events in the United States.
 2015 in Australian television for television related events in Australia.
 2015 in Belgian television for television related events in Belgium.
 2015 in Brazilian television for television related events in Brazil.
 2015 in British television for television related events in Great Britain.
 2015 in Scottish television for television related events in Scotland.
 2015 in Canadian television for television related events in Canada.
 2015 in Croatian television for television related events in Croatia.
 2015 in Danish television for television related events in Denmark.
 2015 in Dutch television for television related events in the Netherlands.
 2015 in Estonian television for television related events in Estonia.
 2015 in French television for television related events in France.
 2015 in German television for television related events in Germany.
 2015 in Indian television for television related events in India.
 2015 in Irish television for television related events in Ireland.
 2015 in Italian television for television related events in Italy.
 2015 in Japanese television for television related events in Japan.
 2015 in Mexican television for television related events in Mexico.
 2015 in New Zealand television for television related events in New Zealand.
 2015 in Norwegian television for television related events in Norway.
 2015 in Pakistani television for television related events in Pakistan.
 2015 in Philippine television for television related events in the Philippines.
 2015 in Polish television for television related events in Poland.
 2015 in Portuguese television for television related events in Portugal.
 2015 in South African television for television related events in South Africa.
 2015 in Spanish television for television related events in Spain.
 2015 in Swedish television for television related events in Sweden.
 2015 in Turkish television for television related events in Turkey.

 
Mass media timelines by year